Conesa is a department of the province of Río Negro (Argentina).

References 

Departments of Río Negro Province